2151 Hadwiger, provisional designation , is a Marian asteroid from the central region of the asteroid belt, approximately 15 kilometers in diameter. It was discovered on 3 November 1977, by Swiss astronomer Paul Wild at Zimmerwald Observatory near Bern, Switzerland.

Orbit and characterization 

Hadwiger orbits the Sun at a distance of 2.4–2.7 AU once every 4 years and 1 month (1,497 days). Its orbit has an eccentricity of 0.06 and an inclination of 15° with respect to the ecliptic. It is a member of the Maria family of asteroids.

In the Tholen classification, Hadwiger is a carbonaceous CSU-type. It has a rotation period of hours with a brightness variation of in magnitude.

Naming 

This minor planet was named in memory of Swiss mathematician Hugo Hadwiger (1908–1981), professor at the University of Berne for more than 40 years and very popular for his refined art of presentation. The approved naming citation was published by the Minor Planet Center on 22 September 1983.

References

External links 
 Asteroid Lightcurve Database (LCDB), query form (info )
 Dictionary of Minor Planet Names, Google books
 Asteroids and comets rotation curves, CdR – Observatoire de Genève, Raoul Behrend
 Discovery Circumstances: Numbered Minor Planets (1)-(5000) – Minor Planet Center
 
 

Maria asteroids
Hadwiger
Hadwiger
CSU-type asteroids (Tholen)
19771103